Ferdinand Willem, Duke of Wurttemberg-Neuenstadt (12 September 1659, in Neuenstadt am Kocher – 7 June 1701, in Sluis) was a general in the Dutch army.

Ferdinand Wilhelm (original German spelling) was the sixth child of Frederick (Württemberg-Neuenstadt). He fought at the Battle of the Boyne in 1690 and the Battle of Steenkerque in 1692. In 1693 Ferdinand Wilhelm was send by William III with 16.000 men to raid Artois. The people of Artois eventually paid him 6 million guilders in contributions.

Appointed general on 20 August 1693 after the Battle of Neerwinden, he became commander of the Garde te Voet as successor of Count Solms, who was killed at the battle.

1659 births
1701 deaths
People from Neuenstadt am Kocher
Dutch nobility
Willem
Dutch generals
Dutch military personnel of the Nine Years' War
17th-century Dutch military personnel
Sons of monarchs